Gârbești may refer to several villages in Romania:

 Gârbești, a village in Todireni Commune, Botoșani County
 Gârbești, a village in Țibana Commune, Iași County